PP-40 Sialkot-VI is a Constituency of Provincial Assembly of Punjab.

See also
 PP-39 Sialkot-V
 PP-41 Sialkot-VII

References

External links
 Election commission Pakistan's official website
 Awazoday.com check result
 Official Website of Government of Punjab

Constituencies of Punjab, Pakistan